Red Bastard is a live bouffon clown theatre show written and performed by Eric Davis.

Overview
What begins with a surreal monologue by a twisted clown named Red Bastard quickly devolves into full blown audience participation.

References

External links

Red Bastard music video

Theatre in the United States
Comedy tours
Clowns
Touring theatre